Astrid Marian Saastad Ottesen (born 24 November 1975) is a Norwegian actress who has been performing in theatre, television, and film since 2001. She is best known to international audiences from the Netflix series Lilyhammer and Norsemen.

Life and career
Ottesen was born in Florø and grew up in Skien, where she attended theatre school. She graduated from the Norwegian National Academy of Theatre in 1999. Ottesen worked in several productions at Oslo Nye Teater, Centralteatret, as well as the National Theatre in Oslo, until 2006.

She has since appeared in a number of television productions and films, including Elsk meg i morgen (2005), Gone with the Woman (2007), Lilyhammer, and Norsemen.

Personal life
In 2018, Ottesen married Norsemen co-star Nils Jørgen Kaalstad.

Awards and recognition
 Amanda Prize 2006 for Elsk meg i morgen (nominated)
 Kanon Award 2007 for Gone with the Woman (won)
 Amanda Prize 2008 for Gone with the Woman (nominated)

Selected filmography

References

External links
 
 Marian Saastad Ottesen at Panorama talent agency

1975 births
Living people
Norwegian dramatists and playwrights
Norwegian film actresses
Norwegian stage actresses
Norwegian television actresses
21st-century Norwegian actresses
People from Skien